Prescription, prescriptive, or prescribe may refer to:

Health care
Medical prescription, a plan of care written by a physician or other health care professional
Prescription drug, a drug available only by a medical prescription
Eyeglass prescription, written by an ophthalmologist or an optometrist

Law
 Custom (law), prescriptive right is enjoyed through long use
 Easement by prescription, acquisition of private property rights through uncontested use
 Prescription (sovereignty transfer), acquisition of sovereignty through uncontested use
 Period of prescription, in civil law jurisdictions, the time limit within which a lawsuit must be brought
 Prescribed sum, the maximum fine that may be imposed on summary conviction of certain offences in the United Kingdom
 Prescribed senior official, an individual who will be refused admission into Canada because of war crimes or crimes against humanity

Other uses
Linguistic prescription, the laying down of normative language rules
Prescriptive analytics,  third and final phase of business analytics 
Prescriptive barony, a "feudal" barony in Scotland
Prescriptive ethics, normative ethics, as distinct from meta-ethics and descriptive ethics
Prescriptive notation, a type of Chinese musical notation

See also 
 Prescription Act 1832, United Kingdom
 Proscription, word sometimes confused with prescription